Derby County's Player Of The Season award is voted for by the club's supporters and named in honour of Jackie Stamps (The Jack Stamps Trophy) – who scored two goals in Derby's sole FA Cup final victory in 1946. It was first introduced in the 1968–69 season.

Key

Winners

+ Cited sources as at and subsequent to Derby County's 1968-1969 season.

Wins by playing position

Wins by nationality

Footnotes

References

General

Specific

Player Of The Year
Derby County Player Of The Year
Association football player non-biographical articles